Asteritea is a genus of fungi in the Microthyriaceae family; according to the 2007 Outline of Ascomycota, the placement in this family is uncertain. This is a monotypic genus, containing the single species Asteritea roureae. Asteritea is a parasitic or saprobic fungus that appears as black spots on the underside of leaves. Wu, Hyde, and Chen describe Asteritea as having "flattened ascomata with a star-like opening and superficial mycelium with hyphopodia" and suggest placement in the Asterinaceae family.

References

External links
Index Fungorum
Images of Asteritea

Microthyriales
Monotypic Dothideomycetes genera